Sweety Sima Hembram is an Indian politician currently serving as a Member of the Legislative Assembly from the Katoria seat in Bihar representing the Rashtriya Janata Dal. Hembram won her seat in the 2015 Bihar Legislative Assembly election, becoming one of 28 women MLAs.

References

Bihar MLAs 2015–2020
Rashtriya Janata Dal politicians
Women members of the Bihar Legislative Assembly
Living people
Santali people
Year of birth missing (living people)
21st-century Indian women politicians